

1994 Colombian Squad 

Head coach: Francisco Maturana

Source FIFA

1994 FIFA World Cup Qualification 

Qualification - CONMEBOL Group A

August 1, 1993, Barranquilla, Colombia -  0 - 0 

August 1, 1993, Lima, Peru -  0 - 1 

August 8, 1993, Asunción, Paraguay -  1 - 3 

August 8, 1993, Lima, Peru -  0 - 1 

August 15, 1993, Asunción, Paraguay -  2 - 1 

August 18, 1993, Barranquilla, Colombia -  2 - 1 

August 22, 1993, Buenos Aires, Argentina -  2 - 1 

August 22, 1993, Asunción, Paraguay -  1 - 1 

August 29, 1993, Buenos Aires, Argentina -  0 - 0 

August 29, 1993, Barranquilla, Colombia -  4 - 0 

September 5, 1993, Lima, Peru -  2 - 2 

September 5, 1993, Buenos Aires, Argentina -  0 - 5 

Colombia qualified. Argentina advanced to the CONMEBOL / CONCACAF / OFC Intercontinental Play-off.

1994 FIFA World Cup 
The 1994 FIFA World Cup, the 15th staging of the World Cup, was held in the United States from June 17 to July 17.  Colombia was placed in Group A with Romania, USA, and Switzerland.  Before the World Cup began however the Colombians found themselves in a problematic situation. Colombia's preparations were conducted against a backdrop of rumors that betting syndicates and drug cartels were exercising their influence over the squad. Coach Francisco Maturana was reported to have received death threats over matters of team selection. Gabriel Jaime Gomez Jaramillo (known as Barabas) was dropped from the squad presumably because of threats, with Hernán Gaviria taking his place.

Whatever the truth, Colombia's players were affected. They looked edgy and unfocused as they suffered a shock 3–1 loss in their opening game against Romania.

Colombia: 1-3 :Romania 

The match between Colombia and Romania was the first game for either side in the group phase. Colombia began the match well and were allowed a great deal of possession by the Romanians who seemed content to defend in depth. Some of the Colombians football was breathtaking, demonstrating their superior ball play. However, against the run of play, Romania took the lead in the 16th minute with their first attack of the match when Florin Raducioiu took on three defenders before firing home a low shot past goalkeeper Oscar Cordoba.  The Colombians kept on showing off their dazzling skills and were constantly threatening the equaliser, however on the half-hour mark, Gheorghe Hagi made it 2-0 when he noticed Cordoba out of position and dipped a cross over his head into the net. The Colombians had excellent opportunities however the Romanian keeper, Stelea kept the Romanian lead intact with a string of brilliant saves until Valencia pulled a goal back for the Colombians in the 43rd minute when he headed in a corner from Perez. In the second half, The Colombians put the Romanians under a great deal of pressure with Stelea called upon to prevent goal-bound attempts from Asprilla and Alvarez before Florin Raducioiu put the result beyond doubt with his second goal in the final few minutes.  Romania won this encounter 3–1, and the Colombians knew victory against USA in their following match would be vital if they were to progress any further.

United States: 2-1 :Colombia 

Nonetheless, the most crucial game in Group A for Colombia.  The USA knew they weren't favorites but played with passion and determination while Colombia was focused on attacking their opponents in order to get an early goal.   As the game started off, the Americans put up fierce resistance as Colombia launched several attacks.  The Americans survived an early scare when Marcelo Balboa had to clear the ball out of the goal's mouth after goalkeeper Tony Meola had failed to save the shot from Anthony de Avila.  Balboa and Alexi Lalas held the creative Colombians at bay in the center of the defense while Earnie Stewart and John Harkes led several counterattacks against Colombia.  In the 35th minute, John Harkes crossed the ball towards Earnie Stewart, and it was deflected by Colombian defender Andres Escobar into the net to give the U.S. a shocking 1–0 lead.  Andres Escobar was stretching out to cut the cross and clear the ball out of the penalty area.  Celebrations went wild as the USA took the lead.  Colombia continued its attacks while Andres Escobar was determined to repair his error.  In the 56th minute, Tab Ramos fired a shot through Colombia's defense, and Earnie Stewart was there to tap it in past Oscar Cordoba for the 2–0 lead.  Even though Adolfo Valencia scored a late goal for Colombia, the U.S. claimed their victory.

Switzerland: 0-2 :Colombia 

With two defeats in their opening matches, Colombia's only hope to reach the 2nd Round was to defeat Switzerland and hope Romania would lose against the US in order to end in third place due to goal differences. Due to the format of the 1994 World Cup, the four best third-place finishers would advance. A header by Gavaria and a shot by Lozano gave Colombia a 2–0 victory over Switzerland. However, news that Romania had won against the US meant Colombia was out and going home. Even if the US had beaten Romania, the two goal margin over Switzerland would have been insufficient for Colombia to advance as they would have finished fifth among third place teams behind Russia, who finished with a better goal difference.

Six days later, on July 2, Escobar was shot to death outside a bar in a Medellín suburb. According to Escobar's girlfriend, the killer shouted "¡Gooooooooooooool!" (mimicking South American sporting commentators for their calls after a goal is scored) for each of the 12 bullets fired.  The murder was widely believed to be retribution for the own goal scored in the game against the United States.

1994 FIFA World Cup - Group A [Final Standings] 

Group A - Final Standings

References

 
Countries at the 1994 FIFA World Cup